Cloontaghmore or Cloontamore is a townland in the south of County Longford, in Ireland. It consists of a number of houses and farmsteads and a school. It is located on the road from Longford town to the village of Newtowncashel. The local primary school is called Cloontagh National School, and consists of two classrooms and a playground. It was awarded a Green Schools Flag for Environmental Awareness by An Taisce.

References

Townlands of County Longford